The following is a list of episodes for the YTV animated series, League of Super Evil. The series is produced by Nerd Corps Entertainment in association with YTV Canada Inc. In the UK the series aired on CBBC.

Series overview
{| class=wikitable style=text-align:center;
|-
! colspan="2" |Season
! Episodes
! Season premiere
! Season finale
|-
| style="background:#00bfff;"| 
| style="text-align:center;"| 1
| style="text-align:center;"| 26
| style="text-align:center;"| 
| style="text-align:center;"| 
|-
| style="background:#FF5F5F;"|
| style="text-align:center;"| 2
| style="text-align:center;"| 13
| style="text-align:center;"| 
| style="text-align:center;"| 
|-
| style="background:#6CA635;"|
| style="text-align:center;"| 3
| style="text-align:center;"| 13
| style="text-align:center;"| 
| style="text-align:center;"| 
|}
In international airings where the segments of each episode are shown as individual episodes, a teaser either related or not related to the episode's story is shown and always involves one or more members of the League.

Episodes

Season 1 (2009)
 Season 1 premiered on March 7, 2009, and finished on December 18, 2009. This season has 26 episodes.
 This was the only season that aired in the US on Cartoon Network.

Season 2 (2010)
 Season 2 premiered on September 11, 2010, and finished on December 11, 2010. This season has 13 episodes.
 This season never aired in the US, and aired only on YTV in North America.

Season 3 (2012)
 Season 3 first premiered on March 5, 2012 on CBBC in the UK and concluded on May 9, 2012. It later aired on YTV from June 2, 2012 to August 25, 2012. This season never aired in the US.
 This season has 13 episodes.

References

League of Super Evil